Frank Ewen Booth (October 4, 1910 – December 1, 1980) was an American competition swimmer who represented the United States at the 1932 Summer Olympics in Los Angeles, California.  Booth won a silver medal as a member of the second-place U.S. team in the men's 4×200-meter freestyle relay, with fellow Americans George Fissler, Maiola Kalili and Manuella Kalili.

See also
 List of Olympic medalists in swimming (men)

External links
 

1910 births
1980 deaths
American male freestyle swimmers
Olympic silver medalists for the United States in swimming
Swimmers from Los Angeles
Swimmers at the 1932 Summer Olympics
Medalists at the 1932 Summer Olympics